Hartung is a surname. Notable people with the surname include:

 Billy Hartung (actor) (b. 1971), American actor and dancer
 Clint Hartung (1922–2010), former Major League Baseball player
 Eugen Hartung (1897–1973), Swiss painter
 Frederick Hartung (1857–?), Member of the Wisconsin State Assembly
 Fritz Hartung (1883–1967), political and constitutional historian of Germany
 Georg Hartung (c. 1822–c. 1891), German geologist
 Hans Hartung (1904–1989), German-French abstract painter
 Horst von Pflugk-Harttung (1889–1967), German intelligence officer and spy for Nazi Germany
 John Hartung (b. 1947), Associate Professor of Anesthesiology at the State University of New York
 Kaylee Hartung (b. 1985), American television journalist
 Max Hartung (b. 1989), German fencer
 Otto Schmidt-Hartung (1892–1976), German general
 Peter Hartung (b. 1959), director of the Adelaide Institute
 Valery Hartung (b. 1960), Russian politician
 Wilfried Hartung (b. 1953), German swimmer
 Willi Hartung (1915–1987), Swiss painter.
 William D. Hartung (b. 1955), director of the Arms Trade Resource Center at the World Policy Institute